Anu Raghavan (born 20 April 1993) is an Indian sprinter who competes in the 400 metres and 400 metres hurdles events.

In 2016, she filed a case in the Kerala High Court against Athletics Federation of India (AFI), after having been left out of the Indian 4 × 400 metres relay team for the 2016 Summer Olympics, calling it a battle against "corruption and nepotism within the Federation." She stated that she was left out of the Olympics contingent as well as the South Asian Games contingent earlier that year because she "chose to train outside the national camp."

Raghavan won the silver medal in the 400 metres hurdles event at the 2017 Asian Athletics Championships, clocking a time of 57.22 seconds.

Career

Rio Olympics 2016 
Despite being a member of the World Championship 2015, Beijing and Asian Meet 2015 at Wulan, China, Raghavan was excluded from the 4 x 400 relay team set to represent India at the Rio Olympics 2016. Her petition alleged that the AFI as well as the Sports Authority of India (SAI), based on recommendations made by Yuri Ogorodnik- the national track and field coach- picked a slower and dope-tainted Ashwini Akkunji instead of Raghavan.

The Rio-bound team consisted of M. R. Poovamma, Nirmala Sheoran, Anilda Thomas and Debashree Mazumdar, with two 'reserve' spots contested by Raghavan, Akkunji, Priyanka Pawar and Jisna Mathew. The AFI and Ogorodnik later came to the decision that the spots be given away to Mathew and Akkunji.

Claiming injustice, Raghavan sought legal resort and filed a petition with the Kerala High Court, which later directed the AFI to include Raghavan in the team. However, the AFI claimed that the last date for inclusion of athletes had already passed. She also said that the AFI cited Akkunji's experience as the criterion for her selection,"but they are defending her with her performance record from six years back".

In November 2015, the AFI also asked Raghavan to join a national camp, and any athlete who fails to fails to attend the camp would not be considered for the Olympics. Raghavan, however, pointed out that her post-graduate education would be adversely impacted if she attends the camp, which solicited no response from the AFI.

References

External links
 

1993 births
Living people
Indian female sprinters
Indian female hurdlers
Athletes from Palakkad
Sportswomen from Kerala
Athletes (track and field) at the 2018 Asian Games
Asian Games medalists in athletics (track and field)
Asian Games bronze medalists for India
Medalists at the 2018 Asian Games